Switch II is the second album from the R&B group Switch, released in 1979. Included on the album is one of the band's biggest and most often-sampled hits, "I Call Your Name".

Track listing
"You're the One For Me" - (Bobby DeBarge, Elaine Brown, Phillip Ingram) 4:29
"Next To You" - (Greg Williams) 4:11
"Best Beat In Town" - (Bobby DeBarge) 4:48
"Calling On All Girls" - (Hazel Jackson, Jermaine Jackson, Maureen Bailey) 4:34
"Go On Doin' What You Feel" (Jermaine Jackson, Maureen Bailey, Michael Smith) - 5:39
"Fallin'" - (Greg Williams) 5:47
"I Call Your Name" - (Bobby DeBarge, Greg Williams) 7:33

Charts

Weekly charts

Year-end charts

Singles

References

External links
 Switch-Switch II at Discogs

1979 albums
Gordy Records albums
Switch (band) albums